Yahya bin Awang (born 7 September 1950) is a Malaysian cardiothoracic surgeon; born to the former state governor (Yang di-Pertua Negeri) of Pulau Pinang from 1981 to 1989, Tun Dr. Awang Hassan and Toh Puan Khadijah Abdul Rahman, sister of Tun Dr. Ismail Abdul Rahman, the 2nd Deputy Prime Minister of Malaysia.

He went on to help found and headed the National Heart Institute of Malaysia (Institut Jantung Negara) (IJN) in 1992 and in 1997 he performed the first heart transplant in Malaysia there.

Honours and awards

Honours of Malaysia
  :
  Officer of the Order of the Defender of the Realm (KMN) (1989)
  Commander of the Order of Loyalty to the Crown of Malaysia (PSM) – Tan Sri (2003)
  :
  Companion of the Order of the Crown of Johor (SMJ) (1989)
  Knight Commander of the Order of the Crown of Johor (DPMJ) – Dato' (1992)
  :
  Knight Companion of the Order of Sultan Ahmad Shah of Pahang (DSAP) – Dato' (1996)
  :
  Companion of the Order of the Defender of State (DMPN) – Dato' (1994)

Awards
  : Merdeka Award (2014)

References

1950 births
Living people
Malaysian people of Malay descent
Malaysian Muslims
Malaysian cardiac surgeons
Monash University alumni
Commanders of the Order of Loyalty to the Crown of Malaysia
Officers of the Order of the Defender of the Realm
Knights Commander of the Order of the Crown of Johor
Companions of the Order of the Crown of Johor